The following is a list of episodes of Family Outing (패밀리가 떴다). Family Outing was a South Korean television variety show that comprised SBS's Good Sunday lineup, along with Gold Miss is Coming (골드미스가 간다). It first aired on June 15, 2008 with the first season ending on February 14, 2010.  The second season began on February 21, 2010 before ending on July 11, 2010. The show is filmed over two days and one night, then edited to comprise two broadcast episodes.

The first "Family" was composed of comedian/MC Yoo Jae-suk, singer/songwriter/MC Yoon Jong-shin, singer Kang Dae-sung, singer Lee Hyori, actor Kim Su-ro, singer Kim Jong-kook, actor Park Hae-jin, actress Park Si-yeon, actress Park Ye-jin and actor Lee Chun-hee. The "Family," along with a special guest(s), travel to different parts of South Korea and takes care of the house of an elderly family while that family goes on a vacation. The "Family" then accomplishes the tasks left for them by the owners of the house.  Along with the assigned tasks, they play games and prepare dinner and breakfast for themselves. The second "Family" was composed of Yoon Sang-hyun, Kim Won-hee, Ji Sang-ryeol, Shin Bong-sun, Yoona, Ok Taecyeon, Jo Kwon, Kim Heechul, and Jang Dong-min.

A total of 102 episodes have aired.

Episodes

Season 1

Season 2

Notes

References

External links
 Family Outing on the Official Good Sunday page

Family Outing
Family Outings